Han Jong Ok (born 28 August 1986) was a North Korean female artistic gymnast, representing her nation at international competitions.

She participated at the 2004 Summer Olympics and the 2003 World Artistic Gymnastics Championships.

References

External links
http://ocasia.org/Viewvideos1.aspx?Vgid=209&i=1&Page=226&vpage=8

1986 births
Living people
North Korean female artistic gymnasts
Place of birth missing (living people)
Gymnasts at the 2004 Summer Olympics
Olympic gymnasts of North Korea
Gymnasts at the 2002 Asian Games
Asian Games medalists in gymnastics
Asian Games gold medalists for North Korea
Asian Games silver medalists for North Korea
Medalists at the 2002 Asian Games
Universiade silver medalists for North Korea
Universiade medalists in gymnastics
21st-century North Korean women